Craig Moore (born 16 August 1994) is a Scottish footballer who plays as a forward for Darvel. Moore has previously played for Motherwell and has had loan spells with Cowdenbeath and Ayr United.

Career
Moore started his career with Motherwell, playing for their youth teams up to under-20 level. On 31 January 2013, he went on a one-month loan to Cowdenbeath of the First Division, making his first-team debut as a substitute in a 1–1 home draw against Raith Rovers. That loan was then extended to the end of the season on 6 March 2013. On 25 March 2013, after five appearances and four goals on loan at Cowdenbeath, Moore signed a new contract with parent club Motherwell until Summer 2015.

On 8 August 2013, Moore made his debut for Motherwell appearing as a substitute in a Europa League match against Kuban Krasnodar. He made his league debut for Motherwell against Hearts as a substitute on 19 October 2013, scoring with his very first touch. He suffered a cruciate ligament injury in his right knee during a match against Inverness Caledonian Thistle in May 2014. On 2 June 2014, Moore signed a contract extension, keeping him at Fir Park until June 2016.

On 30 July 2015, Moore joined Scottish League One side Ayr United on loan until 4 January 2016. On 5 January 2016, his loan with Ayr was extended until the end of the season. After a successful season with the Honest Men, it was confirmed in July 2016 that Moore would return on loan to Somerset Park for the 2016–17 season.

After returning to Motherwell at the end of the season, Moore was released by the club in May 2017 following the end of his contract. He subsequently returned to Somerset Park once again on 25 May 2017, signing a one-year contract with the side who he'd previously had two loan spells with.

On 20 May 2021, Moore signed for West of Scotland League side Darvel.

Career statistics

Honours
SFL Young Player of the Month: March 2013

References

External links
 Craig Moore profile at Motherwell FC official website
 

1994 births
Living people
People educated at Uddingston Grammar School
Footballers from Glasgow
Scottish footballers
West of Scotland Football League players
Association football forwards
Motherwell F.C. players
Cowdenbeath F.C. players
Ayr United F.C. players
Scottish Football League players
Scottish Professional Football League players